The 1923 All-Pacific Coast Conference football team consists of American football players chosen by various organizations for All-Pacific Coast teams for the 1923 college football season.

All-Pacific Coast selections

Quarterback
 Harold "Chappy" Chapman, Oregon (UP-1)

Halfbacks
 Donald Nichols, California (UP-1)
 George "Wildcat" Wilson, Washington (UP-1)

Fullback
 Ernie Nevers, Stanford (UP-1) (College and Pro Football Halls of Fame)

Ends
 Mell, California (UP-1)
 Jim Lawson, Stanford (UP-1)

Tackles
 Norman Anderson, USC (UP-1)
 Beam, California (UP-1)

Guards
 Faville, Stanford (UP-1)
 Hawkins, USC (UP-1)

Centers
 Edwin C. Horrell, California (UP-1)

Key
UP = United Press

See also
1923 College Football All-America Team

References

All-Pacific Coast Football Team
All-Pacific Coast football teams
All-Pac-12 Conference football teams